Ayrton is a given name and surname. Notable people with the name include:

Given name 
 Ayrton Azzopardi (born 1993), Maltese footballer
 Ayrton Badovini (born 1986), Italian motorcycle racer
 Ayrton Cable (born 2003), Slovak social activist
 Ayrton Cicilia (born 2001), Bonaire footballer
 Ayrton Costa (born 1999), Argentine footballer
 Ayrton De Pauw (born 1998), Belgian racing cyclist
 Ayrton Fagundes (1937–1994), Brazilian broadcast journalist
 Ayrton Ganino (born 1985), Brazilian footballer
 Ayrton Lucas (born 1997), Brazilian footballer
 Ayrton Mboko (born 1997), Belgian footballer
 Ayrton Moreira (1917—1975), Brazilian football player
 Ayrton Páez (born 1995), Venezuelan professional footballer
 Ayrton Preciado (born 1994), Ecuadorian soccer player
 Ayrton Ribeiro (born 1997), Portuguese footballer
 Ayrton Sánchez (born 2000), Argentine footballer
 Ayrton Senna (1960–1994), Brazilian racing driver and three-time Formula One world champion
 Ayrton Simmons (born 2001), British racing driver
 Ayrton Statie (born 1994), Bonaire professional footballer
 Ayrton Sweeney (born 1993), South African swimmer
 Ayrton Pinheiro Victor (born 1994), Brazilian footballer

Surname 
 Acton Smee Ayrton (1816–1886), British Liberal politician, uncle of William Edward Ayrton
 Barbara Ayrton-Gould (c. 1886 – 1950), a Labour politician in the United Kingdom
 Edith Ayrton (1879–1945), British writer and activist
 Edmund Ayrton (1734–1808), English organist
 Edward R. Ayrton (1882–1914), British Egyptologist
 Hertha Marks Ayrton (1854–1923), British mathematician and physicist, second wife of William Edward Ayrton
 Norman Ayrton (1924–2017), English actor, director, and theatre instructor
 Matilda Chaplin Ayrton (1846–1883), doctor of medicine, first wife of William Edward Ayrton
 Maxwell Ayrton (1874–1960), Scottish architect
 Michael Ayrton (1921–1975), British artist
 Randle Ayrton (1869–1940), British actor, producer and director
 William Edward Ayrton (1847–1908), British physicist who taught in Japan

In fiction 
 Tom Ayrton, character in Jules Verne's novels In Search of the Castaways and The Mysterious Island

See also 
 
 Ayrton Drugs, a Ghanaian pharmaceuticals company
 Airton (given name)

English-language surnames
Brazilian given names